Leicester High School for Girls also known as 'LHS' is an independent day school for girls aged 3–18 situated in South Knighton, Leicester. It was originally a coeducational school but is now an all-girls school.

History
The school was founded in 1906 as a Christian foundation, welcoming pupils of all faiths and none. It was constituted as a charitable trust in 1975, and is administered by a board of governors which has oversight of both the senior school and junior department. The school was originally called Portland House, and pupils wore distinctive uniforms of yellow and blue striped blazers, grey skirts and straw boaters. The current name has been in existence since 1985, with an update of the uniform taking place in 2006, the school's centenary year.

Extracurricular Activities
There are many after-school activities available ranging from community service projects to interest clubs to performing arts and music groups.

References

External links
Leicester High School for Girls
ISI Report
Profile on MyDaughter

Girls' schools in Leicestershire
Educational institutions established in 1906
1906 establishments in England
Private schools in Leicester
Member schools of the Girls' Schools Association
Church of England private schools in the Diocese of Leicester